Sopot is a commune in Dolj County, Oltenia, Romania with a population of 2,001 people. It is composed of seven villages: Bașcov, Beloț, Cernat, Pereni, Pietroaia, Sârsca and Sopot.

References

Communes in Dolj County
Localities in Oltenia